Hanchongnyon (Hanguk Daehak Chonghaksaenghoi ryonhap), also known as the Confederation of Korean Students’ Union or the South Korean Federation of University Students Councils, is a pro-North Korea leftist student organization in South Korea. Hanchongnyon supports a North Korean-led unification of Korea and instigates Korean college students to overturn the South Korean state system. In particular, it condemns the continued presence of the United States Forces Korea (USFK), which it sees as a humiliating vestige of U.S. imperialism and advocates on behalf of Korean reunification. Hanchongnyon is widely known for its effort to overturn the South Korean state system, mainly through demonstrations.

History 
Its main headquarters were Korea University (Seoul) and Chonnam University (Gwangju). The ideological roots of the organisation can be traced to the mid-1980's, when radical students and intellectuals had become increasingly aware of the North Korean Juche ideology, some of whom reacted to it favorably and began to agitate in favor of the North and against the traditional pro-American South Korean state.

In August 1996, a Hanchongnyon protest was held at Yonsei University, where harsh criticisms were levied against then-president Kim Young-sam. The students also voiced support for North Korea's preferred policies in regards to reunification and inter-Korean relations. After the North began to use the demonstration as part of its own state propaganda, the Kim government forcefully dispersed the demonstration. As a result, one policeman died and hundreds on both sides were injured before police finally raided the campus building and detained 3,500 protestors. Most were released from the police stations the next day but 280 were formally arrested and charged for violating the National Security Act and other statues. Kim vowed to root out pro-North radicals from universities and held a meeting with 300 university administrators to discuss methods to do so. The move was not without controversy, with some drawing comparisons to the 1980 Gwangju Uprising.

It was criminalized under the National Security Act in 1999 for alleged pro-North Korean activities. The North Korea-based Pomchonghakryon considers the Hanchongnyon as its southern headquarters.

As the Soviet Union collapsed and the North Korean famine occurred, many of the North-friendly groups lost popularity, and many activists later stated they became more skeptical towards North Korea.

See also 
21C Korea College Students' Union (Handaeryeon)
Chongryon
Education in South Korea
Politics of South Korea
Democratic Labor Party (South Korea)
Progressive Party (South Korea, 2017)
Juchesasangpa, the South Korean political organization advocating Juche
Student movements in Korea

References

External links 

Korean nationalist organizations
Anti-imperialism in Korea
Left-wing nationalism in South Korea
Political movements in South Korea
Student organizations in South Korea
Student organizations established in 1993